Linda Jackson may refer to:

 Linda Jackson (cyclist) (born 1958), Canadian professional cyclist
 Linda Jackson (designer) (born 1950), Australian fashion designer, fashion retailer and artist
 Linda Jackson (politician), former mayor of Vaughan, Ontario (2006–2010)
 Linda Jackson (businesswoman), CEO of French car manufacturer Citroën